The Los Molles Formation is a geologic formation of Early to Middle Jurassic age, located at northern and central part of Neuquén Basin at Mendoza Shelf in Argentina. It is overlain by the Niyeu–Lajas Formation.

Description 

It is the second largest oil and gas formation in the Neuquén Basin after the Vaca Muerta. In July 2015, the Buenos Aires Herald indicated that Pan American Energy and YPF planned to drill 46 shale gas wells in Los Molles over the next four years in their Lindero Atravesado drilling block, at an estimated cost of US$590 million.

Fossil content 
In several outcrops, the Los Molles formation has been the site of paleontological discoveries: the ichthyosaurs Chacaicosaurus and Mollesaurus, and, in 2017, an ornithischian, Isaberrysaura, discovered with fossilized contents of the gut.

See also 
 Vaca Muerta
 List of dinosaur bearing rock formations
 Toarcian turnover
 Toarcian formations
Marne di Monte Serrone, Italy
 Calcare di Sogno, Italy
 Sachrang Formation, Austria
 Posidonia Shale, Lagerstätte in Germany
 Ciechocinek Formation, Germany and Poland
 Krempachy Marl Formation, Poland and Slovakia
 Lava Formation, Lithuania
 Azilal Group, North Africa
 Whitby Mudstone, England
 Fernie Formation, Alberta and British Columbia
 Poker Chip Shale
 Whiteaves Formation, British Columbia
 Navajo Sandstone, Utah
 Mawson Formation, Antarctica
 Kandreho Formation, Madagascar
 Kota Formation, India
 Cattamarra Coal Measures, Australia

References

Bibliography 

  
 
 

Geologic formations of Argentina
Jurassic System of South America
Early Jurassic South America
Middle Jurassic South America
Jurassic Argentina
Pliensbachian Stage
Aalenian Stage
Toarcian Stage
Bathonian Stage
Bajocian Stage
Callovian Stage
Shale formations
Source rock formations
Reservoir rock formations
Formations
Fossiliferous stratigraphic units of South America
Paleontology in Argentina
Oil fields in Argentina
Unconventional oil
Shale gas
Geology of Mendoza Province
Geology of Neuquén Province